"Ma Chérie" is a song by Swiss DJ  and producer DJ Antoine taken from his studio album Welcome to DJ Antoine. It features Serbian DJ-duo, The Beat Shakers and features the vocals of Swiss singer-songwriter Maurizio Pozzi. The song became a top-ten hit in Austria, Belgium, Czech Republic, France, Germany, Hungary, Italy, Russia, Slovakia, Poland and Switzerland. The original song was created in the 2007 by The Beat Shakers with the voice of the singer Alberto, the lyrics by Danica Krstajić and the music by Boris Krstajić.

A remix of the song with Pitbull and Mad Mark was released in 2013, gaining over 20 million streams on Spotify as of 2020. In addition, another remix with both Pitbull and Enrique Iglesias was recorded, but never released.

Track listings

Charts and certifications

Weekly charts
Original version

Ma Chérie 2k12 version

Year-end charts

Certifications

References

External links
 

2010 songs
2011 singles
2012 singles
Songs written by Kalenna Harper